Mary Anna Sibell Elizabeth Marten OBE (1929–2010) was an English aristocrat and landowner who made legal history in the Crichel Down affair.

Early life
Mary Anna Sibell Elizabeth Sturt was born on 12 September 1929 at Moor Crichel, the daughter of Napier Sturt, 3rd Baron Alington and  Lady Mary Sibell Ashley-Cooper, daughter of the 9th Earl of Shaftesbury, sometime Lord Steward to the Household of George V & Queen Mary, by his wife Lady Constance Sibell Grosvenor who died in 1957, who was a great friend of Queen Mary, daughter of Earl Grosvenor, and sister of Hugh Grosvenor, 2nd Duke of Westminster.

She was god-daughter to Queen Elizabeth (later The Queen Mother), and her only son, Napier Anthony Sturt Marten, was a page to HM Queen Elizabeth II.

She enlisted in Buckingham Palace Brownies unit, alongside Princess Margaret, and went to school in Lancaster Gate, later attending Cheltenham Ladies' College. Upon the death of her father, Baron Alington in active service in the RAF in 1940, Mary Anna inherited the Crichel House Estate in Dorset as a Minor. In 1948 she went up to Somerville College, Oxford, to read agriculture, where she met her future husband on her first day. She did not complete her degree.

Mary Anna and her husband, Lt.-Cdr. George (Toby) Gosselin Marten, L.V.O. D.S.C., Royal Navy, (1918 - 1997), son of Vice-Admiral Sir Francis Arthur Marten, K.B.E., C.B., C.M.G., C.V.O., were married on 25 November 1949 at Holy Trinity Brompton. He was an equerry to George VI, and the marriage was attended by George VI, Queen Elizabeth (Mary Anna's godmother), Princess Margaret, the Duke and Duchess of Gloucester, the Duchess of Kent, the Earl and Countess of Athlone.

The Martens had six children (a son, and five daughters).

Crichel Down affair
, part of the Alington family's Crichel Down estate in Dorset had been compulsorily purchased by the Government in 1938 for Royal Air Force bomb training use. The price they paid was £12,000 and Prime Minister Winston Churchill's binding undertaking in 1942 stated that should the Government no longer require the land for the designated acquisition purpose, the land would be offered back to the original owners; the promise was not immediately honoured. Mary Anna and her husband took on the various Governments, and following a public inquiry report, in 1954 they won back the title to their original land. This resulted in the resignation of Sir Thomas Dugdale, the Agricultural Minister deemed responsible for the mishandling of the matter. The episode set a legal precident and became known as The Crichel Down affair, a term still used in British legislation.

Mary Anna died on 18 January 2010 and following her death the entire Crichel Down estate was offered for sale but the asking price was not met.

Archaeology
Marten was an archaeologist of note. In 1956, her brother-in-law, Tim Marten, was head of the chancery at the Embassy of the United Kingdom, Tehran. During a visit to him, she became deeply attached to Iran, which she explored over many subsequent visits, often staying with the archaeologist Roman Ghirshman at his excavations at Choga Zanbil.

In 1988, Marten established The Ancient Persia Fund at the British Academy in memory of the distinguished Russian scholar Vladimir G. Lukonin. The aim of the fund was and is to encourage and support the study of Ancient Persia and related areas including Central Asia, in the period before the coming of Islam.

Marten was appointed a trustee of the British Museum by the prime minister on 5 December 1985. She was reappointed twice (5 December 1990 and 5 December 1995). She retired on the 4 December 1998. She served on the following committees of the British Museum:
 Buildings (where she occupied the chair);
 External Relations and Public Services;
 2003 and
 Great Court Client.

Marten was acting chair of the British Museum Society from 15 December 1990 to 29 February 1992 and she was also on the British Museum Development Trust [BMDT] board of trustees. She was also the trustees' representative on the council of the National Trust from 16 December 1993 to 31 December 1996.

In 2002, she presented one of 12 eagle brooches worn by Queen Victoria's bridesmaids to the British Museum to mark the retirement of the director, R. D. Anderson.

Marten was also a trustee of the Charles Sturt Museum in Grange, South Australia.  Marten was also a collector of Chinese works of art, many inherited. She was a collector of jade and of rare books

She was appointed an Officer of the Most Excellent Order of the British Empire (OBE) in the 1980 New Year Honours "for political service in Wessex".

In 2008, Marten published (privately) her memoirs entitled As it Was.

Later life
Marten was High Sheriff of Dorset from 1989 to 1990.

Marten died on 18 January 2010.  The funeral was held at St. Giles's Church, Wimborne St. Giles, Dorset, on 29 January 2010. She was buried with her husband in Witchampton Churchyard, Dorset; the grave is to the north east of the church.

References

1929 births
2010 deaths
Officers of the Order of the British Empire
Daughters of barons
Alumni of Somerville College, Oxford
High Sheriffs of Dorset